Mystique was a long running illusion show at Blackpool Pleasure Beach featuring many different types of illusions, comedy and dance.

The show ran until 2006 and featured illusionist Richard De Vere and his canine companion Schnorbitz for many years.

2006 Cast

2005 Cast List

2004 Cast List

2003 Cast List

2002 Cast List

2001 Cast List

2000 Cast List

1999 Cast List

1997 Cast List

1996 Cast List

1995 Cast List

Blackpool Pleasure Beach